Antongomena Bevary is a town and commune in Madagascar. It belongs to the district of Mitsinjo, which is a part of Boeny Region. The population of the commune was estimated to be approximately 13,000 in 2001 commune census.

Only primary schooling is available. The majority 94% of the population of the commune are farmers.  The most important crop is rice, while other important products are cassava and sweet potatoes.  Services provide employment for 1% of the population. Additionally fishing employs 5% of the population.

References and notes 

Populated places in Boeny